Carcinidae is a family of crabs belonging to the order Decapoda. It has four subfamilies, including Pirimelinae which was previously treated as a family.

Taxonomy

The family as currently circumscribed includes four subfamilies and eight genera, six with living members and two known only through fossils:

 Ramacarcinus 
 Subfamily Carcininae 
 Carcinus 
 Miopipus 
 Subfamily Parathranitiinae 
 Parathranites 
 Subfamily Pirimelinae 
 Pirimela 
 Sirpus 
 Subfamily Platyonichinae 
 Portumnus 
 Xaiva

References

Decapods
Decapod families